Tympanella is a fungal genus  in the family Bolbitiaceae. A monotypic genus, it contains the single secotioid species Tympanella galanthina, found in New Zealand. Mycologist Egon Horak defined the genus in 1971. T. galathina was originally described as Agaricus galathinus in 1890 by Mordecai Cubitt Cooke and George Edward Massee.

See also
 List of Agaricales genera

References

External links
 
 
 

Bolbitiaceae
Fungi of New Zealand
Monotypic Agaricales genera